The Farm Credit Administration is an independent agency of the federal government of the United States. Its function is to regulate the financial institutions that provide credit to farmers.

Authority
The Farm Credit Administration is an independent agency of the Executive Branch of the federal government of the United States. It regulates and examines the banks, associations, and related entities of the Farm Credit System, a network of borrower-owned financial institutions that provide credit to farmers, ranchers, and agricultural and rural utility cooperatives, as well as provides oversight for Farmer Mac. It derives its authority from the Farm Credit Act of 1971. The FCA is headquartered in McLean, Virginia, near Washington, DC.

History
The Farm Credit Administration was established by Executive Order 6084, which transferred most of the functions of the Federal Farm Board to the new Agricultural Adjustment Administration. The Federal Farm Board was then renamed the Farm Credit Administration.

The Farm Credit Act of 1933 provides for organizations within the Farm Credit Administration. The Farm Credit Act of 1933 was part of President Franklin D. Roosevelt's New Deal, to help farmers refinance mortgages over a longer time at below-market interest rates at regional and national banks. This helped farmers recover from the Dust Bowl. The Emergency Farm Mortgage Act loaned funds to farmers in danger of losing their properties. The campaign refinanced 20% of farmer's mortgages.

An Executive order by Roosevelt in 1933 placed all existing agricultural credit organizations under the supervision of a new agency, the Farm Credit Administration. This included the Federal Farm Board. The Farm Credit Administration was independent until 1939, when it became part of the U.S. Department of Agriculture, but became an independent agency again under the Farm Credit Act of 1953. This Act created a Federal Farm Credit Board with 13 members (one from each of the 12 agricultural districts and one appointed by the Secretary of Agriculture) to develop policy for the Farm Credit Administration.

The Farm Credit Act of 1971 recodified all previous acts governing the Farm Credit System.

List of Chairpersons

See also
 Title 12 of the Code of Federal Regulations
 Commodity Credit Corporation
 Farm Service Agency
 Farm Credit System Insurance Corporation

References

External links
 
 Farm Credit Administration in the Federal Register

Independent agencies of the United States government
Financial regulatory authorities of the United States
McLean, Virginia
1933 in the United States
Farm Credit System